Aramides is a genus of birds in the family Rallidae.

It contains the following 8 species:

There is also a doubtful species:
 Red-throated wood rail, Aramides gutturalis - extinct (20th century?)

References

External links

 
Bird genera
Taxonomy articles created by Polbot
Taxa named by Jacques Pucheran